The 18-300mm 3.5-6.3G lens (not to be confused with the 18-300mm  3.5-5.6G lens) is a telephoto superzoom lens manufactured by Nikon for its line of DX DSLR cameras.

As with other DX format lenses, the smaller image circle makes it compatible only with APS-C-sized image sensors. If used on a 35mm film SLR, vignetting will occur; however, the lens can be used on an FX DSLR because the camera can be automatically or manually set "DX Crop Mode", eliminating vignette, but also reducing the image area from an FX-size sensor to a DX-size sensor

The lens is designed to be an all-in-one solution. This lens does not replace the 18-300mm 3.5-5.6G.

The differences between the lens and the 18-300mm 3.5-5.6G are as follows:

Since it has the same focal length as the 3.5-5.6G, it shares the record of having the largest zoom range of any other lens (interchangeable camera lenses only) currently manufactured.

Features 

The lens has the following features:

Nikon's Silent Wave Motor to drive the autofocus mechanism quickly and almost completely silently (denotes the "AF-S on the lens body).

Nikon's VR (Vibration Reduction) for image stabilization (denotes the "VR" on the lens body).

Nikon's Extra-low Dispersion (ED) glass elements to remove chromatic aberrations that may occur (denotes the "ED" on the lens body).

Nikon's Internal Focusing (IF) to prevent the lens assembly from changing sizes during focusing so it can remain compact.

Aspherical lens elements to remove other types of aberrations that may occur.

Nikon's Super Integrated Coating on the lens elements to improve color on photographs and reducing ghosting and flaring.

Specifications

References

Nikon F-mount lenses
Camera lenses introduced in 2014